Bharat Sevashram Sangha is a Hindu religious and spiritual organisation focused on humanitarian work. It was founded in 1917 by the illustrious patriot saint Acharya Srimat Swami Pranavananda Maharaj. It is purely a philanthropic and charitable organization with non-sectarian, non-communal and non-political character and outlook. The  headquarter of the Sangha is situated in Kolkata, West Bengal with more than three hundreds of branches in India and also in other countries including the United Kingdom, United States, Guyana, Trinidad and Tobago, Canada, Fiji and Bangladesh. It has initiated several missions to African countries, Malaysia, and Indonesia; monks from the Sangha have accompanied United Nations delegations to Syria and Lebanon.

Activities
The Sangha is recognized for their community work, helping poor and providing healthcare to those in need. 

The Sangha has responded to natural calamities in Andhra Pradesh and Orissa states, the Bengal famine of 1943, the Bhopal disaster, the 2001 Gujarat earthquake, and the 2004 Indian Ocean tsunami. At times of political unrest such as the Partition of India, the Sangha has set up refugee camps and war evacuee camps in the border areas.

It has organised several projects to help impoverished Indian tribal people. One such project involved providing schooling for children of the Sabar tribe and providing them with housing and healthcare. It also hosts courses to train youths in information technology to enable them to find jobs which require IT skills.

Following the 2004 Indian Ocean earthquake, the Sangha's monks proposed to set up a school for orphans at a cost of Rs. 4250,000s, an orphanage at Rs.6020,000, and 200 houses at Rs.30 million on the Andaman and Nicobar Islands. In Tamil Nadu state, where the tsunami killed more than 7,000 in the districts of Cuddalore, Nagapattinam and Chennai, the Sangha was one of the first to begin massive relief operations by building nearly 200 new houses at Sonankuppam village in Cuddaloer. Fishing boats and nets were also distributed to locals who had lost everything to the sea.

To spread message against violence and hatred in India and Bangladesh, the organization has also produced biopics based on Swami Pranavananda

The Sangha actively provides shelter, food, medical treatment and public safety services to pilgrims at various places of worship and religious fairs in India, such as the Kumbha Mela. It operates free hospitals at Barajuri and Kolkata, mobile dispensary and medical units in sixty-four locations, a free residence for patients and their families in Navi Mumbai, and four hospitals and homes for leprosy patients. A 500-bed hospital at Joka, Kolkata was inaugurated in 2010 by the Indian Finance Minister as an example of private-public partnerships in healthcare.

In May 2020, the Sangha was one of the few organizations who extended help to the people after the destruction caused by Cyclone Amphan. They also provided relief work to almost thousands people per day with food at different parts of the country due to COVID-19 lockdown in India.

References

External links
 Bharat Sevashram Sangha
Bharat Sevashram Sangha Hospital

  
 

Charities based in India
Organisations based in Kolkata
Hindu organizations
Hindu organisations based in India
Hindu relief organizations
Hindu new religious movements
Hindu religious orders
Religious organizations established in 1917
1917 establishments in British India